The Ruth Lyttle Satter Prize in Mathematics, also called the Satter Prize, is one of twenty-one prizes given out by the American Mathematical Society (AMS). It is presented biennially in recognition of an outstanding contribution to mathematics research by a woman in the previous six years. The award was established in 1990 using a donation from Joan Birman, in memory of her sister, Ruth Lyttle Satter, who worked primarily in biological sciences, and was a proponent for equal opportunities for women in science. First awarded in 1991, the award is intended to "honor [Satter's] commitment to research and to encourage women in science".  The winner is selected by the council of the AMS, based on the recommendation of a selection committee. The prize is awarded at the Joint Mathematics Meetings during odd numbered years, and has always carried a modest cash reward. Since 2003, the prize has been $5,000, while from 1997 to 2001, the prize came with $1,200, and prior to that it was $4,000. If a joint award is made, the prize money is split between the recipients.

, the award has been given 15 times, to 16 different individuals. Dusa McDuff was the first recipient of the award, for her work on symplectic geometry. A joint award was made for the only time in 2001, when Karen E. Smith and Sijue Wu shared the award. The 2013 prize winner was Maryam Mirzakhani, who, in 2014, was the first woman to be awarded the Fields Medal. This is considered to be the highest honor a mathematician can receive. She won both awards for her work on "the geometry of Riemann surfaces and their moduli spaces". The most recent winner is Kaisa Matomäki, who was awarded the prize in 2021 for her "work (much of it joint with Maksym Radziwiłł) opening up the field of multiplicative functions in short intervals in a completely unexpected and very fruitful way".

The Association for Women in Science have a similarly titled award, the Ruth Satter Memorial Award, which is a cash prize of $1,000 for "an outstanding graduate student who interrupted her education for at least 3 years to  raise a family".

Recipients

See also
 List of mathematics awards

References

Awards of the American Mathematical Society
Science awards honoring women
American science and technology awards
Awards established in 1990
Lists of women scientists
United States science-related lists
Lists of mathematicians by award
International awards
Women in mathematics